The sixth  season of Latin American Poker Tour was held in 2013.  There were 6 stops during the season, held in many different countries in Latin America.  All amounts are in US dollars.

Results

LAPT Viña del Mar 
 Casino: Enjoy Viña del Mar Casino & Resort
 Buy-in: $1,100
 Date: March 13–17, 2013
 Number of buy-ins:  1024
 Total Prize Pool: $993,280
 Number of Payouts: 160
 Winning Hand: Q♠ T♣

LAPT São Paulo 
 Casino: Tivoli Moffarej
 Buy-in: Approx. $2,000
 Date: April 25–30, 2013
 Number of buy-ins:  753
 Total Prize Pool: $1,315,740
 Number of Payouts: 56
 Winning Hand: Q♠ 4♠

LAPT Colombia 
 Casino: Casino Allegre - Centro Comercial Premium Plaza
 Buy-in: Approx. $1,100
 Date: June 5–9, 2013
 Number of buy-ins:  629
 Total Prize Pool: $571,080
 Number of Payouts: 96
 Winning Hand: 9♣

LAPT Lima 
 Casino: Atlantic City Casino
 Buy-in: $1,650
 Date: July 31 to August 4, 2013
 Number of buy-ins:  557
 Total Prize Pool: $835,500
 Number of Payouts: 88
 Winning Hand: 10♣

LAPT Panama 
 Casino: Veneto Casino
 Buy-in: $1,500 + $150
 Date: September 18–22, 2013
 Number of buy-ins:  570
 Total Prize Pool: $829,340
 Number of Payouts: 88
 Winning Hand: 5♠ 6♠

LAPT Uruguay Grand Final 
 Casino: Mantra Resort & Casino
 Buy-in: $2,300 + $200
 Date: November 21–24, 2013
 Number of buy-ins:  508
 Total Prize Pool: $1,133,340
 Number of Payouts: 80
 Winning Hand: Q♣ 6♣

References 
 Resultados do LAPT (Brazilian Portuguese)

Latin American Poker Tour